Kiban Rai (born 28 May 2005) is a Welsh professional footballer who plays as a midfielder for EFL League Two club Newport County.

Career
Rai joined the youth academy of Newport County at Under 15 level. He made his senior debut for Newport in the 3-1 League Two away defeat to Salford City at Moor Lane on 5 March 2023 as a second-half substitute for Nathan Moriah-Welsh. Rai was an unused substitute in the following two League Two matches, a 1-1 away draw against Grimsby Town and a 1-1 home draw against Bradford City. Rai made his second appearance for Newport in the 1-1 League Two home draw against Wimbledon on 14 March 2023.

International career

Rai was born in Brecon, Wales and he also qualifies to represent Nepal through his parents.

Style of play

Rai mainly operates as an attacking midfielder. He is known for his creativity and technical ability.

References

External links

Newport County AFC Kiban Rai profile

2005 births
Living people
Sportspeople from Brecon
Welsh footballers
Association football midfielders
Newport County A.F.C. players